Stora Sofia was a Danish ship of the line that sank on 25 May 1645 near Buskär outside the harbour of Gothenburg.

Construction and design
The ship was built in 1627 on the Slottö shipyard in Nakskov in Denmark after a design of Scottish shipbuilder Daniel Sinclair. Stora Sofia was the flagship of the navy of the Danish king Christian IV. She was armed with 44 cannons on three decks; according to contemporary sources, she had four 48-pounders, eighteen 24-pounders, twenty 8-pounders and several smaller cannons.

Service
During the short Torstenson War between Denmark-Norway and Sweden in 1645, Denmark put an embargo on the young city of Gothenburg, founded in 1621. Stora Sofia was the flagship of a Danish fleet under admiral Ove Gjedde that was ordered to enforce the embargo. Shortly after the arrival of the fleet, a storm broke loose and threw the Stora Sofia onto the rocks. The ship sank to a depth of 27 metres; her crew was saved.

Discovery of the wreck
The wreck was rediscovered only in 1961. More thorough explorations and archeological studies began in the 1980s.

See also 
Regalskeppet Vasa

Notes

References 

Bergstrand, T.: Stora Sofia – från förfall till bevarande; Marinarkeologisk tidskrift 4–2003, pp. 10 –13. Swedish Marine Archeological Society; ISSN 1100-9632.
Nielsen, E.: Sancte Sophia. Last accessed December 15, 2005.

Shipwrecks in the North Sea
Ships of the line of the Royal Dano-Norwegian Navy
Ships built in Denmark
1620s ships
Maritime incidents in 1645